Stéphane Houdet and Michaël Jeremiasz defeated the defending champion Maikel Scheffers and his partner Robin Ammerlaan in the final, 6–2, 7–5, to win the men's doubles wheelchair tennis title at the 2009 French Open.

Shingo Kunieda and Scheffers were the defending champions, but did not compete together. Kunieda partnered Stefan Olsson, but was defeated by Ammerlaan and Scheffers in the semifinals.

Seeds
 Stéphane Houdet /  Michaël Jeremiasz (champions)
 Shingo Kunieda /  Stefan Olsson (semifinals)

Draw

Finals

External links
Draw

Wheelchair Men's Doubles
French Open, 2009 Men's Doubles